Catsper channel auxiliary subunit epsilon is a protein that in humans is encoded by the CATSPERE gene.

References

Further reading